Calum Anderson Waters (born 10 March 1996) is a Scottish professional footballer who plays for Scottish Championship club Greenock Morton, on loan from Scottish Premiership club Kilmarnock. Waters has previously played for Celtic, Dumbarton, Alloa Athletic, Sligo Rovers and St Mirren.

Club career
Born in Glasgow, Waters started his career with Celtic playing regularly for their development side. He played in Celtic's 5–2 win over Rangers in the Scottish Youth Cup final on 21 May 2015.

He joined Scottish Championship side Dumbarton on loan in July 2015, and made his senior debut for the club in a 3–2 victory over Morton on 25 July 2015. He scored his first senior goal in a 5–0 Scottish Cup victory over Alloa, and also provided an assist for the fifth goal.

He joined Alloa Athletic in May 2016 after leaving Celtic. He scored his first goal for the club – the winner – against Ross County in the Scottish League Cup.

Waters signed for Scottish Premiership club Kilmarnock in June 2017. He was loaned to Irish club Sligo Rovers in February 2018, on a deal due to run until 10 June. Waters was loaned to St Mirren in August 2019.

On 4 February 2023, Waters joined Scottish Championship club Greenock Morton on loan until the end of the season.

Career statistics

References

External links

1996 births
Living people
Association football defenders
Celtic F.C. players
Dumbarton F.C. players
Scottish Professional Football League players
Alloa Athletic F.C. players
Kilmarnock F.C. players
Scottish footballers
Sligo Rovers F.C. players
League of Ireland players
St Mirren F.C. players

Greenock Morton F.C. players
Footballers from Glasgow